For Love or Money is a 1939 American comedy film directed by Albert S. Rogell and written by Charles Grayson and Arthur T. Horman. The film stars June Lang, Robert Kent, Edward Brophy, Etienne Girardot, Richard Lane, Addison Richards, Edward Gargan and Horace McMahon. The film was released on April 28, 1939, by Universal Pictures.

Plot

Cast        
June Lang as Susan Bannister
Robert Kent as Ted Frazier
Edward Brophy as Sleeper
Etienne Girardot as J. C. Poindexter
Richard Lane as Foster
Addison Richards as Kelly
Edward Gargan as Bubbles
Horace McMahon as Dead Eyes
Cora Witherspoon as Mrs. Sweringen
Dora Clement as Miss Upton
Mary Treen as Amy
Raymond Parker as Delivery Boy
Jerry Marlowe as Delivery Boy
Armand Kaliz as Nanda
Alan Edwards as Manager
Hal K. Dawson as Cashier
Eddy Chandler as John
Neely Edwards as Travel Bureau Clerk
Alphonse Martell as Head Waiter
Walter Merrill as Luke
Russ Powell as Night Watchman
Francis Sayles as Bartender
Jack Gardner as Elevator Boy
Charles Regan as Peter
Walter Clinton as Postman
Robin Raymond as Maid

References

External links
 

1939 films
1930s English-language films
American comedy films
1939 comedy films
Universal Pictures films
Films directed by Albert S. Rogell
American black-and-white films
1930s American films